A Massachusetts general election was held on November 3, 1964, in the Commonwealth of Massachusetts.

The election included:
 statewide elections for United States Senator, Governor, Lieutenant Governor, Attorney General, Secretary of the Commonwealth, Treasurer, and Auditor;
 district elections for U.S. Representatives, State Representatives, State Senators, and Governor's Councillors; and
 ballot questions at the state and local levels.

Democratic and Republican candidates were selected in party primaries held on September 10, 1964.

This was the final election before the Term of office for Governor, Lieutenant Governor, Attorney General, Secretary of the Commonwealth, Treasurer, and Auditor was extended from two to four years.

Governor

Republican John A. Volpe was elected over Democrat Francis X. Bellotti, Socialist Labor candidate Francis A. Votano, and Prohibition candidate Guy S. Williams. Incumbent Governor Endicott Peabody lost in the Democratic primary to Bellotti, his Lieutenant Governor.

Lieutenant Governor

Republican Elliot L. Richardson was elected Lieutenant Governor over Democrat John W. Costello.

Republican primary

Candidates
Elliott Richardson, former United States Attorney for the District of Massachusetts

Results
Richardson ran unopposed in the Republican primary for Lieutenant Governor.

Democratic primary

Candidates
John W. Costello, member of the Massachusetts Governor's Council

Withdrew following convention
Joseph E. McGuire, Worcester attorney

Withdrew at convention
Joseph G. Bradley, State Representative from Newton
Edward F. Harrington, mayor of New Bedford
George P. Macheras, Lowell City Councilor
Rico Matera, former State Representative from East Boston

Eliminated at convention
Joseph Alecks
James A. DeGuglielmo
Daniel Dibble, mayor of Holyoke
Thomas S. Eisenstadt, member of the Boston School Committee
George H. O'Fannell, State Representative
Andre R. Sigourney, State Representative from Nahant
Mario Umana, State Senator from East Boston
Harold L. Vaughn

Convention
On the first ballot, Governor's Councillor John W. Costello led with 428 votes to Worcester attorney and Industrial Accident Board member Joseph E. McGuire's 404, state senator Mario Umana's 250, and state representative Joseph G. Bradley's 112. The other seven candidates received less than the 100 votes required to remain on the ballot and Bradley chose to drop out, which left Costello, McGuire, and Umana as the only remaining candidates. Costello led again on the second ballot, with 641 votes to McGuire's 600 and Umana's 343, but did not receive enough votes to win the nomination. The same happened on the third (687 votes for Costello to McGuire's 656 and Umana's 172). On the fourth ballot, Umana fell to 99 votes, which eliminated him from the contest. On the fifth and final ballot Costello won the party's endorsement by defeating McGuire 724 votes to 691.

Results
Costello was unopposed for the nomination for Lieutenant Governor.

General election

Attorney General

Incumbent Attorney General Edward Brooke defeated Democrat James W. Hennigan, Jr.

General election

Results

Secretary of the Commonwealth

Incumbent Secretary of the Commonwealth Kevin White defeated Republican Wallace B. Crawford.

General election

Results

Treasurer and Receiver-General

Incumbent Treasurer and Receiver-General John T. Driscoll did not run for re-election as he had been appointed Chairman of the Massachusetts Turnpike Authority.

Robert Q. Crane defeated Republican Robert C. Hahn in the general election.

Democratic primary

Candidates
John J. Buckley, Mayor of Lawrence and member of the Governor's Council
Robert Q. Crane, State Representative from Brighton
Louise Day Hicks, member of the Boston School Committee
John Francis Kennedy, former Treasurer and Receiver-General (1955–61)

Results

General election

Auditor

Incumbent Auditor Thomas J. Buckley died on September 9, 1964, the night before the Democratic primary. Because no sticker campaign received enough votes to win the nomination, the Democratic State Committee chose Thaddeus M. Buczko to succeed Buckley for the Democratic nomination.

In the general election, Buczko defeated Republican Elwynn Miller.

Democratic primary

Candidates
Thomas J. Buckley, incumbent (died September 9, 1964)

Results

Committee vote

General election

Results

United States Senate

Democrat Ted Kennedy was re-elected over Republican Howard J. Whitmore, Jr., Socialist Labor candidate Lawrence Gilfedder, and Prohibition candidate Grace F. Luder.

References

 
Massachusetts